An earth lodge is a semi-subterranean building covered partially or completely with earth, best known from the Native American cultures of the Great Plains and Eastern Woodlands.  Most earth lodges are circular in construction with a dome-like roof, often with a central or slightly offset smoke hole at the apex of the dome.   Earth lodges are well-known from the more-sedentary tribes of the Plains such as the Hidatsa, Mandan, and Arikara, but they have also been identified archaeologically among sites of the Mississippian culture in the eastern United States.

Structure

Construction materials and techniques

Earth lodges were typically constructed using the wattle and daub technique, with a thick coating of earth. The dome-like shape of the earth lodge was achieved by the use of angled (or carefully bent) tree trunks, although hipped roofs were also sometimes used. During construction the workers would dig an area a few feet beneath the surface, allowing the entire building to have a floor somewhat beneath the surrounding ground level. They set posts into holes in the ground around the edges of the earth lodge, and made the tops meet in (or near) the middle. Their size is limited by the length of available tree trunks. Internal vertical support posts were sometimes used to give additional structural support to the roof rafters.

After a strong layer of sticks (or reeds) was wrapped through and over the radiating roof timbers, the people often applied a layer of thatch as part of the roof. The structure was then entirely covered in earth. The earth layer (and the partially subterranean foundation) provided insulation against the extreme temperatures of the Plains.  The structures consisted of a clay outer shell over an inner shell of long grasses and a woven willow ceiling. The middle of the earth lodge was used as a fire pit, and a hole was built into the center. This smoke hole was often covered by a bullboat during inclement weather. Logs were gathered each spring as the ice receded and sheared them off; fresh logs were also cut. The most common wood used was cottonwood. Cottonwood was a wet, soft wood; this meant that lodges often required rebuilding every six to eight years.

Labor and use
In Hidatsa culture, men only raised the large logs; the rest of the work was done by women. Therefore, a lodge was considered to be owned by the woman who built it. A windbreak was built on the interior of the lodge, blocking the wind and giving privacy to the occupants. Earth lodges often also contained cache pits (root cellar-type holes) lined with willow and grasses, within which dried vegetables were stored.

Locations
Earth lodges were often built alongside tribal farm fields, alternating with tipis (which were used during the nomadic hunting season). A reconstructed earth lodge can be seen at the Glenwood, Iowa's Lake Park. A village entirely made up of earth-lodges may be seen at New Town, North Dakota. The village consists of six family-sized earth lodges and one large ceremonial lodge. In addition, a garden area and corrals have been built for authenticity. The park is open to the public and located west of New Town at the Earthlodge Village Site. The park is the central point in a rebuilding and cultural renewal effort by the three affiliated tribes of the Fort Berthold Indian Reservation. This is the only village of its kind to be constructed by the Mandan, Hidatsa and Arikara Nations in over 100 years.

Use by the Mississippian culture
A number of major Mississippian culture mound centers have identified earth lodges, either beneath (i.e. preceding) mound construction or as a mound-top building.  Sequential constructions, collapses, and rebuilding of earth lodges seems to be part of the mechanism of construction for certain mounds (including the mound at Town Creek Indian Mound and some of the mounds at the Ocmulgee National Monument). In Kanabec County, Minnesota, the Groundhouse River flows through such a center.  According to Newton H. Winchell in The Aborigines of Minnesota, the river was named for the earth lodges of the Hidatsa, who lived in the area before being driven westward to the Missouri River by the Sioux.  The Hidatsa lived in wooden huts, covered with earth.

See also

Earth house
Kiva
Quiggly hole
Zemlyanka
Vernacular architecture

References

External links

House types
Traditional Native American dwellings
Pre-Columbian architecture
Mound builders (people)
Indigenous culture of the Great Plains
Semi-subterranean structures
Vernacular architecture
Indigenous architecture
Western (genre) staples and terminology